Oélilton Araújo dos Santos (born 8 March 1981), commonly known by his nickname Etto, is a Brazilian former professional footballer. As of 1 September 2007, Etto also holds Croatian citizenship beside Brazilian, and had expressed his desire to play for Croatia at the international level.

Career

Career in Brazil
His professional career in Brazil started in 2002 and consisted of one-season stints with Bahia, Criciúma, Paraná and Atlético Paranaense, whence he moved to Dinamo Zagreb for the 2005–06 Prva HNL season.

Dinamo Zagreb
Etto arrived to his new club in August 2005. In his debut season with the Croatian club Etto featured in 24 league matches and scored 5 goals in what would end up being the title winning campaign for Dinamo Zagreb. The following season Etto made inconsisted appearances and featured in only 13 league matches for the club. He also made his debut in European competitions, making a total of four appearances throughout the season. He won his first double with the club as Dinamo Zagreb were both league champions and cup winners for the 2006–07 season. Etto also played in the 2006 Croatian Supercup which Dinamo Zagreb won 4–1 against Rijeka.

The 2007–08 was most successful for Etto since his arrival as he made a total of 40 appearances for the club and scored one goal. He also repeated the success with the club from the last season, again winning the double. The 2008–09 Prva HNL season saw Etto feature in only 16 out of 33 league matches for the club, making a total of 28 appearances in all competitions. The club won its third consecutive double since Etto's arrival.

He featured in 21 out of the 30 matches of the 2009–10 Prva HNL and made 10 appearances in UEFA competitions, also making four appearances in the 2009–10 Croatian Cup which made a total of 35 appearances.

PAOK
On 28 January 2011, Etto signed a two-and-a-half-year contract with Greek Super League side PAOK.

Baku
On 5 August 2013, Etto signed a one-year contract with Azerbaijan Premier League side Baku.

Career statistics

Note: the Croatian Cup appearances for Dinamo Zagreb can be viewed at the official website of the club nk-dinamo.hr under The Match section.

1 Including the 2006 Croatian Supercup match against Rijeka.
2 Including the 2010 Croatian Supercup match against Hajduk Split.

Honours

Dinamo Zagreb
 Prva HNL: 2006, 2007, 2008, 2009, 2010
 Croatian Cup: 2007, 2008, 2009
 Croatian Supercup: 2006, 2010

References

External links
Theplayersagent Profile
 

1981 births
Living people
Brazilian footballers
Esporte Clube Vitória players
Criciúma Esporte Clube players
Paraná Clube players
Club Athletico Paranaense players
GNK Dinamo Zagreb players
Brazilian expatriate footballers
Croatian Football League players
Expatriate footballers in Greece
PAOK FC players
Super League Greece players
Esporte Clube Bahia players
FC Baku players
Expatriate footballers in Azerbaijan
Association football fullbacks
Croatian people of Brazilian descent